The Governor of Nizhny Novgorod Oblast is the head of Nizhny Novgorod Oblast.

History 
In the Soviet era, the leading role in the leadership of the region was occupied by the Gorky Regional Committee of the CPSU. June 1988 to November 1991, the first secretary of the Gorky Regional Committee of the CPSU was Gennady Khodyrev.

In 1990, there was a sharp decline in the influence of party committees in connection with the abolition on March 14, 1990 of Article 6 of the Constitution of the USSR, which determined the "leading and guiding role" of the CPSU. Russian regions actually began to develop according to the model of a “parliamentary republic”. As a result, the first person in the region was the chairman of the regional council of people's deputies. Most of the leaders of the regional party committees sought to be elected as the chairman of the regional council and combine both positions - the Constitution and legislation did not prohibit this. This happened in the Gorky region - in April 1990, Gennady Khodyrev became chairman of the Gorky regional council, while remaining the first secretary of the regional committee. However, on June 20, 1990, the First Congress of People's Deputies of the RSFSR adopted the Decree “On the Mechanism of Democracy in the RSFSR”, which said: “The position of the head of a state authority or government with any other position, including political or public, is not allowed in the RSFSR political organizations.” Thus, the first secretaries who combined the posts of the party and Soviet leaders of the region were presented with a choice: first, between subordination and disobedience to the Russian Congress; secondly, in case of consent to submit, between two posts. Gennady Khodyrev, like some other first secretaries of the regional committees, decided not to obey and remained in both posts.

On October 22, 1990, by decree of the Presidium of the Supreme Council of the RSFSR, the Gorky Region was renamed the Nizhny Novgorod Region. On April 21, 1992, the Congress of People's Deputies of the RSFSR approved the renaming of the region by amending Art. 71 of the Constitution of the RSFSR of 1978, which entered into force May 16, 1992 from the date of publication in the “Rossiyskaya Gazeta”.

On August 19, 1991, during the August coup, Gennady Khodyrev was on vacation near Foros. Having returned after the GKChP defeat, he had to make a choice: whether to remain at the head of the regional committee of the CPSU-KP of the RSFSR or strengthen his position as chairman of the Regional Council of People's Deputies. Khodyrev chose to remain the head of the regional committee (however, on November 6, the CPSU was banned for supporting the putsch). He was replaced by the chairman of the regional Council of People’s Deputies was elected Evgeny Krestyaninov.

Since the end of 1991, the main mechanism for the legitimization of regional government bodies has been associated with the popularity of the President of Russia, Boris Yeltsin, who received legitimacy in a popular vote. At the beginning of the cardinal changes, the President of Russia had virtually unlimited powers to form the executive branch in the constituent entities of the Russian Federation. It was assumed that the election of regional leaders would be introduced in all regions. In August 1991, Russian President Boris Yeltsin promised that elections would be held as soon as possible, but a new institution was created for the transitional period — the head of the regional administration appointed by the president (administration refers to a regional executive body). On November 30, 1991, 32-year-old Boris Nemtsov was appointed head of the administration of the Nizhny Novgorod Region by presidential decree.

At the suggestion of Nemtsov, the Regional Council approved a new job title - the governor.

December 17, 1995 in the Nizhny Novgorod region held the first election of the governor. The largest number of votes (58.37%) was gained by the current governor Boris Nemtsov. The Kommersant newspaper wrote that in 1995 Boris Nemtsov “earned the notoriety of a reformer”, whose experience in the restructuring of the economy of a particular region was recommended by the government everywhere.

Nemtsov’s term of office was 4 years. However, only 2 years later, on March 17, 1997, the politician was appointed First Deputy Prime Minister of the Russian Government in the second government of Viktor Chernomyrdin. Acting Governor of the Nizhny Novgorod Region became Vice Governor Yuri Lebedev.

Early elections were held on June 29, 1997. None of the candidates gained more than 50% of the vote, and the mayor of Nizhny Novgorod Ivan Sklyarov (40.95%) and the State Duma deputy from the Communist Party Gennady Khodyrev (37.84%) got into the second round. In the second round on July 13, Ivan Sklyarov won with 52% of the vote.

List of governors

References

External links 

 
Politics of Nizhny Novgorod Oblast
Nizhny Novgorod Oblast